Alvin Ward Gouldner (July 29, 1920 – December 15, 1980) taught sociology at Antioch College (1952–1954)  and was professor of sociology at Washington University in St. Louis (1957–1967), at the University at Buffalo  (1947-1952), president of the Society for the Study of Social Problems (1962), professor of sociology at the University of Amsterdam (1972–1976) and Max Weber Professor of Sociology at Washington University (from 1967). He was born in New York City.

His early works such as Patterns in Industrial Bureaucracy can be seen as important as they worked within the existing fields of sociology but adopted the principles of a critical intellectual. This can be seen more clearly in his 1964 work Anti-Minotaur: The Myth of Value Free Sociology, where he claimed that sociology could not be objective and that Max Weber had never intended to make such a claim.

He is probably most remembered in the academy for his 1970 work The Coming Crisis of Western Sociology. This work argued that sociology must turn away from producing objective truths and understand the subjective nature of sociology and knowledge in general and how it is bound up with the context of the times. This book was used by many schools of sociology as analysis of their own theory and methods. However, Gouldner was not the first sociologist to be critical of objective knowledge of society, see for example Theodor W. Adorno's Negative Dialectics.

Subsequently, much of Gouldner's work was concerned with critiquing modern sociology and the nature of the intellectual. He argued that ideology often produced false premises and was used as a tool by a ruling elite and that therefore critical subjective thought is much more important than objective thought.

Gouldner achieved public prominence when he was accused of beating and kicking Laud Humphreys, then a graduate student at Washington University, who Gouldner suspected of hanging a satirical cartoon poster criticizing Gouldner on the sociology department bulletin board.

Major works 
 1950: Studies in Leadership
 1954: Patterns of Industrial Bureaucracy
 1954: Wildcat Strike: A Study in Worker-Management Relationships
 1959: Organizational Analysis
 1959: Reciprocity and Autonomy in Functional Theory
 1960: The Norm of Reciprocity : a Preliminary Statement
 1964: Anti-Minotaur: The Myth of Value-Free Sociology
 1966: Enter Plato
 1970: The Coming Crisis of Western Sociology
 1973: For Sociology: Renewal and Critique in Sociology Today
 1976: The Dialectic of Ideology and Technology:  The Origins, Grammar and Future of Ideology.
 1979: The Future of Intellectuals and the Rise of the New Class: A Frame of Reference, Theses, Conjectures, Arguments, and an Historical Perspective on the Role of Intellectuals and Intelligentsia in the International Class Contest of the Modern Era
 1980: The Two Marxisms: Contradictions and Anomalies in the Development of Theory 
 1985: Against Fragmentation: The Origins of Marxism and the Sociology of Intellectuals

Patterns of Industrial Bureaucracy (1954) 
Gouldner led an ethnographic study in a mine and identified there various patterns of bureaucracy and bureaucratization. He analyzed how after the appointment of a new manager the bureaucratization process emerged. Gouldner identified three types of bureaucracy in his studies with very specific patterns:
 Mock bureaucracy: this type comes from outside agency and is implemented officially, but not in daily behaviors. Both management and workers agree in this case to act the same way. The rules are not enforced in this case, neither by management, nor by the workers. No conflict seem to emerge in this case. "Smoking" is in this case seen as inevitable. The no-smoking rule is an example of mock-bureaucracy.
 Representative bureaucracy: both management and workers enforced this rule and it generated very few tensions. In this context, the focus was on the education of workers as management considered them as ignorant and careless regarding security rules. The safety program is an example of representative. Meetings happened regularly to implement this program and it was as well the occasion to voice some concerns for workers. For the management, this program was a way to tighten the control over workers.
 Punishment-centered bureaucracy: this type of program was initiated by management and generated many tensions. Management viewed workers as deliberately willing to be absent. Therefore, punishment was installed in order to force the workers not to be absent. For example, the "no-absenteeism" rule is an example of the punishment-centered bureaucracy.

References

External links 

 Why Mills and Not Gouldner? by Charles Lemert
 Stalinism: A Study of Internal Colonialism (Full Text) Telos 34 (Winter 1978). New York: Telos Press.
 Alvin Gouldner on Intellectuals and the Social Totality
 http://engagedscholarship.csuohio.edu/cgi/viewcontent.cgi?article=1023&context=clsoc_crim_facpub
 E.P. Hollander & R.G. Hunt : Perspectives in Social Psychology. New York, Oxford University Press. 1963

American sociologists
Columbia University alumni
University at Buffalo faculty
Washington University in St. Louis faculty
1920 births
1980 deaths
American expatriates in the Netherlands